Philander P. Humphrey (February 26, 1823 – August 18, 1862) was an American physician and politician.

Born in Torrington, Connecticut, Humphrey was trained as a physician at Oberlin College. In 1852, Humphrey moved to Red Wing, Minnesota Territory. In 1857, Humphrey served in the Minnesota Territorial Council. On August 18, 1862, Humphrey, his wife, and two of their children were killed in the Battle of Lower Sioux Agency, where he was the physician for the Sioux Tribe.

References

1823 births
1862 deaths
People from Torrington, Connecticut
People from Red Wing, Minnesota
Oberlin College alumni
Members of the Minnesota Territorial Legislature
Dakota War of 1862
Physicians from Minnesota
19th-century American politicians